The Winthrop Ballpark is a baseball venue in Rock Hill, South Carolina. It is home to the Winthrop Eagles baseball team of the NCAA Division I Big South Conference.  The venue has a capacity of 1,989 spectators.

History 
Renovations between the 2000 and 2001 season added the Wayne Patrick Press Box, stadium lightning, dugouts, and concessions.  In 2008, further renovations added offices, practice facilities, a weight room, a dugout, a players lounge, and a luxury box.

The venue has hosted five Big South Conference baseball tournaments, in 2002, 2003, 2004, 2007, and 2010.  Coastal Carolina has won all of them.

See also
 List of NCAA Division I baseball venues

References 

College baseball venues in the United States
Baseball venues in South Carolina
Winthrop Eagles baseball